The Victims of Iaşi Pogrom Monument is an obelisk to the victims of Iași pogrom, unveiled on June 28, 2011, in front of the Great Synagogue (Iaşi), Romania. The black marble obelisk replaced a former obelisk "In Memory of the Victims of the Fascist Pogrom of Iaşi, June 28–29, 1941."

Gallery

References

External links
 Monuments to the Victims of the June 1941 Pogrom 

Jews and Judaism in Iași
Holocaust memorials
Culture in Iași
Tourist attractions in Iași
Outdoor sculptures in Romania
The Holocaust in Romania
Obelisks in Romania
2011 in Romania
2011 sculptures
Buildings and structures completed in 2011
Marble sculptures
Buildings and structures in Iași